Pierre Caille may refer to:
 Pierre Caille (sculptor) (1911–1996), Belgian sculptor, painter, engraver, ceramicist and jeweller
 a man who bought a vineyard in 1543, now the Butte-aux-Cailles neighborhood in Paris

See also
 Pierre (disambiguation)
 Caille (disambiguation)